Kalyal is a rural locality (a selo) and the administrative centre of Kalyalskoye Rural Settlement, Rutulsky District, Republic of Dagestan, Russia. The population was 399 as of 2010.

Geography 
It is located 39 km northwest of Rutul.

Nationalities 
Tsakhur people live there.

References 

Rural localities in Rutulsky District